Gerald Seymour (born 25 November 1941 in Guildford, Surrey) is a British writer of crime and espionage novels.

Early life
Gerald Seymour was born to William Kean Seymour and his second wife, Rosalind Wade. He was educated at Kelly College, now known as Mount Kelly in Tavistock, Devon, and took a BA Hons degree in Modern History at University College London.

Career
Initially a journalist, he joined ITN in 1963, covering such topics as the Great Train Robbery, Vietnam War, The Troubles, the Munich Olympics massacre, Germany's Red Army Faction, Italy's Red Brigades and Palestinian militant groups. His first book, Harry's Game, was published in 1975, and Seymour then became a full-time novelist, living in the West Country. In 1999, he featured in the Oscar-winning documentary, One Day in September, which portrayed the Munich massacre. He has been a full-time writer since 1978.

Television adaptations have been made of his books Harry's Game, The Glory Boys, The Contract, Red Fox, The Informant based on Field of Blood, A Line in the Sand and The Waiting Time.

Bibliography
Harry's Game (1975), 
The Glory Boys (1976), 
Kingfisher (1977), 
Red Fox (1979), published in the US as The Harrison Affair
The Contract (1980), 
Archangel (1982), 
In Honour Bound (1984), 
Field of Blood (1985), 
A Song in the Morning (1986), published in the US as Shadow on the Sun
At Close Quarters (1987), published in the US as An Eye for an Eye
Home Run (1989), published in the US as The Running Target
Condition Black (1991), 
The Journeyman Tailor (1992), 
The Fighting Man (1993), 
The Heart of Danger (1995), 
Killing Ground (1997), 
The Waiting Time (1998), published in the US as Dead Ground
A Line in the Sand (1999), 
Holding the Zero (2000), 
The Untouchable (2001), 
Traitor's Kiss (2003), 
The Unknown Soldier (2004), 
Rat Run (2005), 
 The Walking Dead (2007), 
 Time Bomb (2008) 
 The Collaborator (2009) 
 The Dealer and the Dead (2010) 
 A Deniable Death (2011) 
 The Outsiders (2012) 
 The Corporal's Wife (2013) 
 Vagabond (2014) 
 No Mortal Thing (2015) 
 Jericho's War (2017) 
 A Damned Serious Business (2018) 
 Battle Sight Zero (2019) 
 Beyond Recall (2020) 
 The Crocodile Hunter (2021) 
 The Foot Soldiers (2022) 
 In At The Kill (Due for release 19 Jan 2023)

References

External links
Gerald Seymour official website at his previous publisher's site
Brief synopsis for many of his books, on one page.
 

1941 births
Alumni of University College London
20th-century English novelists
21st-century English novelists
English male journalists
ITN newsreaders and journalists
Living people
People from Guildford
People educated at Kelly College
English male novelists
20th-century English male writers
21st-century English male writers